Kitson Island Marine Provincial Park is a provincial park protecting all  of Kitson Island and Kitson Islet. The park is located within the asserted traditional territory of the Tsimshian and Metlakatla First Nation, at the mouth of the Skeena River in British Columbia, Canada.

This park is one of a number of marine parks along the Inside Passage, protecting significant wildlife species and their habitats and the portion of Flora Bank within the park. It also features one of only a few easily accessible sandy beaches in the North Coast area.

References

Provincial parks of British Columbia
Islands of British Columbia
North Coast Regional District
North Coast of British Columbia
Marine parks of Canada